The 2007 PGA Tour season ran from January 4, 2007 to November 4, 2007. The season consisted of 47 official money events. This included four major championships and three World Golf Championships, which are also sanctioned by the European Tour. There were also five unofficial events played in November and December. Tiger Woods swept all the major awards for a sixth time.

Twelve players won three million dollars, 34 won two million or more and 99 won one million or more. The cut off to make the top 125 on the money list and retain a tour card was a record $785,180.

The total prize money, as stated on the 2007 schedule of tournaments page of the PGA Tour website, was $271.1 million. The actual prize money was slightly higher – $272,304,886.89 (due to more than 70 players making the cut at most tournaments). If one player had played and won each of the 44 events (excluding the three alternate events), he would have won $46,787,450.

Schedule
The following table lists official events during the 2007 season.

Unofficial events
The following events were sanctioned by the PGA Tour, but did not carry FedEx Cup points or official money, nor were wins official.

Location of tournaments

Money leaders
The money list was based on prize money won during the season, calculated in U.S. dollars.

Awards

See also
2007 in golf
2007 PGA Tour Qualifying School graduates

Notes

References

External links
2007 PGA Tour at ESPN

PGA Tour seasons
PGA Tour